The year 1735 in architecture involved some significant events.

Buildings and structures

Buildings

 The North Quad of All Souls College at the University of Oxford, designed by Nicholas Hawksmoor, is completed.
 The South Range (Front Screen) of The Queen's College, Oxford, is completed.
 Reconstruction of Cathedral of San Carlos De Borromeo (Matanzas) in Cuba is completed.
 Major reconstruction of Udine Cathedral in the Republic of Venice by Domenico Rossi is completed.
 Church of San Francesco di Paola, Milan, designed by Marco Antonio Bianchi, is consecrated.
 Chandos Mausoleum in Canons Park near London, designed by James Gibbs, is built.
 Spanish Riding School in Vienna, designed by Joseph Emanuel Fischer von Erlach, is completed.
 Rokeby Hall in the north of England, designed by Thomas Robinson, is completed.
 8-9 Henrietta Street, Dublin, are built.

Births
 October 27 – William Newton, English architect (died 1790)

Deaths
 Antonio Beduzzi, Italian architect and interior designer working in Vienna (born 1675)

References

Architecture
Years in architecture
18th-century architecture